Pietro Pujia (born 29 June 1965) is an Italian former weightlifter. He competed at the 1984 Summer Olympics and the 1988 Summer Olympics.

References

External links
 

1965 births
Living people
Italian male weightlifters
Olympic weightlifters of Italy
Weightlifters at the 1984 Summer Olympics
Weightlifters at the 1988 Summer Olympics
People from Savona
Sportspeople from the Province of Savona
20th-century Italian people